Chateh is an unincorporated community in northern Alberta in Hay Lake I.R. 209, located  north of Highway 58,  northwest of High Level. It is also known as Assumption.

Localities on Indian reserves in Alberta
Localities in Mackenzie County